Lalacheruvu is a locality in Rajamahendravaram City. It is a part of "Greater Rajamahendravaram Municipal Corporation (GRMC)".  The locality also forms a part of Godavari Urban Development Authority.

Education

 Lalacheruvu Municipal Corporation High School

References

Rajahmundry